Chaigoubu railway station is a station of Jingbao Railway in Hebei, located in Chaigoubu, Huai'an County, Zhangjiakou, Hebei, China.

See also

List of stations on Jingbao railway

Railway stations in Hebei